Harrisons Landing is an unincorporated community in Charles City County, Virginia, United States.

References

Unincorporated communities in Virginia
Unincorporated communities in Charles City County, Virginia